The Sonatina for Clarinet and Piano (H. 356) by the Czech composer Bohuslav Martinů is a late work that was composed in 1956 while Martinů was living in New York.

Structure 
The work is played as a single movement but consists of three well defined sections:
 Moderato
 Andante
 Poco allegro

Style 
The Sonatina reveals the influence of the neoclassicism of Francis Poulenc and Igor Stravinsky and the "rich palette of tone-colours" of Claude Debussy.  It is filled with dance (polka) and march rhythms and virtuosic runs. Passages of a cheerful nature containing unexpected syncopations alternate with more earnest lyrical ones. In this music can be seen the composer's nostalgia for the happier, more productive time he had spent in Paris (1923–1940), years filled with spirited interactions with the group of "Les Six." Notwithstanding its elegance and finish, the music also embraces the passionate strength of his Czech roots.

Published scores 
Sonatina pour Clarinette Si  et Piano. Éditions Alphonse Leduc, AL 21 698.
Sonatina per clarinetto e pianoforte. Partitura e parte. Editio Supraphon, H 7479.

Recording 
Fredrik Fors, clarinet; Sveinung Bjelland, piano (Harmonia Mundi HMN911853; see recording details at Fredrik Fors).

References 

Compositions by Bohuslav Martinů
Martinu
Martinu
1956 compositions